The bar-backed partridge (Arborophila brunneopectus), also known as the brown-breasted hill-partridge, is a species of partridge in the family Phasianidae. It is found in southwestern China and Southeast Asia.

Taxonomy
English zoologist Edward Blyth first described the bar-backed partridge in 1855. 

The bar-backed partridge has three recognized subspecies: 

 A. b. albigula (Robinson & Kloss, 1919)
 A. b. brunneopectusI (Blyth, 1855)

 A. b. henrici (Oustalet,1896)

These subspecies differ in colouration and patterns of their underparts and head, respectively. Some identify the chestnut-bellied partridge and grey-breasted partridge or even the Sichuan partridge or red-breasted partridge as superspecies of the bar-backed partridge.

Description
On average, males have a  tarsus, while females have .

The males are similar in color to females. It is mostly buff in color, with black running from the beak, around the eyes, and to the throat, as well as a black crown and feather tips along its back. It has red eyelids, and its wing feathers are white with black tips, adding brown near the back of the bird.

Distribution and habitat
The bar-backed partridge is found in Cambodia, China, Laos, Myanmar, Thailand, and Vietnam over an estimated .

Its natural habitats are subtropical or tropical moist lowland forests and subtropical or tropical moist montane forests.

Behaviour

They flock in groups of about 4–9, usually consisting of two parents and their latest offspring or sometimes two families. They feed on seeds, small shells, and insects found in leaves on the forest floor. When disturbed by humans, they quickly scatter into the underbrush. Captive male bar-backed partridges attract a mate by exposing the red feathers around their throat and calling. They breed around May to June, and their  eggs are usually laid in a hole covered with bamboo and grass.

Status
The bar-backed partridge has been evaluated as Least Concern by the IUCN due to its large range; however, its population is slowly declining because of habitat loss and hunting, although this decline is not steep enough to make it Vulnerable.

References

External links

bar-backed partridge
Birds of Laos
Birds of Thailand
Birds of Vietnam
Birds of Yunnan
bar-backed partridge
bar-backed partridge
Articles containing video clips
Taxonomy articles created by Polbot